Mark Olson (born August 13, 1957) is a Canadian curler.

He is an international level coach and a past-president of the Manitoba Curling Tour and member of the Manitoba Curling Hall of Fame.

Awards
 Collie Campbell Memorial Award: 1981
Manitoba Curling Hall of Fame: 2008 (with all 1981 Canadian Men's Championship Team skipped by Kerry Burtnyk)

Teams

References

External links
 
 Mark Olson – Curling Canada Stats Archive

Living people
1957 births
Canadian male curlers
Curlers from Winnipeg
Brier champions